This is a list of opinion polls taken on the presidency of Donald Trump in 2019. Polls throughout the year showed that more disapproved of Trump than approved of him, generally by a margin of between five and fifteen percentage points. The polls also showed that the margin may have been stronger or weaker in some states, when compared with the national polls.

December

November

October

September

August

July

June

May

April

March

February

January

See also
Opinion polling on an Impeachment inquiry against Donald Trump

References

Opinion polling in the United States
Opinion polling